Aizawl College is a college in Aizawl, Mizoram, India. It is accredited with B+ Grade by NAAC and has 445 students currently studying in the college.

History
Established as ‘Aizawl College’ in 1975 by a team of philanthropic citizens meeting at the Office chamber of the then Legislative Assembly Speaker, Dr. H.Thansanga, on the 13 January 1975, Aizawl College (later renamed Government Aizawl College following its take-over by the State Government) was formally inaugurated by Pu Ch. Chhunga, the first Chief Minister of Mizoram. Classes started on the evening of 25 August 1975 with 350 students of Pre University Class and six Lecturers.  It was up graded to Deficit Grant-in-aid status with effect from 1 November 1984 and became Government on 1 January 1989. The College was included under section 2(f) of the UGC Act 1956 and section 12(B) of the UGC Act 1956 with effect from 17 March 1987. While affiliated to the NEHU, the college was one of the prominent members of the NEHU family. It is now affiliated to Mizoram University.

Location
Aizawl College was at Sikulpuikawn, Mission Veng, It has been shifted to  Mualpui near Rajiv Gandhi Stadium (Aizawl) with an area of 12471.50 square miles. The Commerce building block,  Cafetaria and Students' Common Room were inaugurated in 2018.

Departments
The College has two stream – Arts and Commerce with eight different disciplines under Arts Stream.

References

External links 
Government Aizawl College Official Website

Universities and colleges in Mizoram
Colleges affiliated to Mizoram University
Education in Aizawl